Rockingham Forest is a former royal hunting forest in the county of Northamptonshire, England. It is an area of some  lying between the River Welland and River Nene and the towns of Stamford and Kettering. It has a rich and varied landscape, with farmland, open pasture, pockets of woodland and villages built from local stone.

History
The forest was named after the village of Rockingham, where the castle was a royal retreat. The boundaries were marked by the River Nene on the eastern side and on the western side what is now the A508 road from Market Harborough to Northampton. Over the years the forest shrank, and today only a patchwork of the north-eastern forest remains. The bulk of the remaining forest is located within a square, of which the corners are Corby, Kettering, Thrapston and Oundle.

The area became a royal hunting ground for King William I after the Norman conquest. The term forest represented an area of legal jurisdiction and remained so until the 19th century.

A Cistercian abbey was established in 1143 which became known as Pipewell Abbey. In 1298 the de Lacys were granted permission to inclose  pertaining to the manor of Wadenhoe, lying within the forest, in order to make a park. The forest boundaries were set in 1299, although the boundaries returned to a smaller area as a result of King Charles I's actions. King Charles II took little interest in the forest and gave away or sold much of it. By 1792 there was no significant royal ownership of the forest area. Parliamentary enclosure of the bailiwicks and disafforestation of Rockingham bailiwick in 1832 resulted in a much smaller forest area with much of the land turned over to agriculture. The Forestry Commission took over the remnants of public woodland in 1923. The forest originally stretched from Stamford down to Northampton.

Geology
The forest extends across a tract of country underlain by sedimentary rocks of Jurassic age, a part of the great Jurassic escarpment stretching from the Cotswolds to the southwest through the East Midlands to the Humber via Lincoln Edge. Largely a mix of mudstone and limestone layers dipping gently eastwards, the sequence is this (in stratigraphic order i.e. youngest/uppermost at top):

Ancholme Group
Oxford Clay Formation
Great Oolite Group
Cornbrash Formation
Blisworth Clay Formation
Blisworth Limestone Formation
Rutland Formation
Inferior Oolite Group
Lincolnshire Limestone Formation
Grantham Formation
Northampton Sand Formation

The plateau is largely covered by glacial till of a stony, clayey nature. Exploitation of the ironstone within the Northampton Sands was the basis for the once-important iron and steel industry in Corby on the western edge of the forest.

Management
Areas managed by the Forestry Commission include:

 Southey Wood, Peterborough
 Wakerley Great Wood
 Bedford Purlieus National Nature Reserve
 Fineshade Wood
 Fermyn Woods

It is famous for its population of red kites which now number 300.

Chequered skipper reintroduction
In the spring of 2018 chequered skipper butterflies (Carterocephalus palaemon) from Belgium were released at a secret site as part of the Back from the Brink (BftB) project. A further release of butterflies from Belgium will take place in the spring of 2019, to supplement the newly emerged offspring of last years release. Invasive scrub has been removed from more than 8 km of woodland rides by Butterfly Conservation and their partners, and if the reintroduction is successful they will be the first native-born chequered skippers to emerge in England in more than 40 years.

See also
 List of forests in the United Kingdom
 List of Ancient Woods in England

External links
 Forestry Commission

References

English royal forests
Forests and woodlands of Northamptonshire
Natural regions of England
Nature reserves in Northamptonshire